Jack Yarber (born March 15, 1967), also known by his stage name Jack Oblivian, is an American singer, songwriter, and guitarist based in Memphis, Tennessee. He was a founding member of the garage bands The Compulsive Gamblers, and The Oblivians and currently fronts Jack O & the Tennessee Tearjerkers.

Yarber has also been a member, or contributed to: The End, Johnny Vomit & The Dry Heaves, Andre Williams, The Knaughty Knights, South Filthy, The Cool Jerks, The Limes, '68 Comeback, King Louie & His Loose Diamonds, Greg Oblivian & the Tip Tops, Jack Oblivian & The Cigarillos, The Natural Kicks and Tav Falco's Panther Burns.

Today, Yarber continues to write, record and tour as a solo artist. In January 2016, he released his seventh solo album, The Lone Ranger of Love. The record was released on his own label, Mony Records.

Johnny Vomit and the Dry Heaves
Jack Yarber began his professional music career in high school, appearing alongside high-school friend and future Squirrel Nut Zippers founder Jimbo Mathus in the Corinth, Mississippi, based Johnny Vomit & the Dry Heaves. Yarber played drums in the outfit, which credited him as Johnny Goopa. Johnny Vomit & the Dry Heaves would go on to be one of Yarber's longest-running side projects, the song "Knick the Knife" on his latest Tennessee Tearjearkers album being a reworked version of a song performed in early Johnny Vomit jam sessions.

The End
In the summer of 1987 (?), Yarber moved to Memphis, Tennessee, to play music with his cousin. Yarber and his cousin played together using a number of band names, eventually releasing a new wave 7-inch under the name The End. The tracks "You Never Called" and "People Talk" (later covered by Cheap Time) were recorded in 1984 at Phillips Studio in Memphis, Tennessee. That vinyl single, released on the Erwin record label marked Yarber's first appearance on record. By 1989 the two had diverged musically and Yarber's cousin left town, effectively ending their partnership.

The Compulsive Gamblers
Following the breakup of The End, Yarber's encounter with fellow musician Greg Cartwright led to the formation of the Compulsive Gamblers. Despite recording two 7-inch albums and a handful of home recordings, the band was unable to garner record label interest until after the success of their next band, the Oblivians. The Compulsive Gamblers would reform in the late 1990s and early 2000s, releasing two studio albums and one live LP on Sympathy For the Record Industry.

The Oblivians
The Oblivians formed in 1993 as a side project to the Compulsive Gamblers, and included former Gambler Greg Cartwright, as well as future Goner Records founder, Eric Friedl. The members of the Oblivians all shared writing and recording responsibilities. Each member supplied vocals, guitar work, and percussion on albums, and switched between instruments during live shows. The Oblivians lasted from 1993 until 1998, at which time Yarber and Cartwright left the band to reform the Compulsive Gamblers. The second incarnation of the Gamblers lasted from 1998 to 2003, when the bandmembers again went their separate ways.

The Tennessee Tearjerkers
After pursuing a brief solo career, Yarber teamed up with Scott Bomar to form the Tearjearkers. As Bomar became more and more involved with film scoring, Yarber began to take a more active role in the band, ultimately taking over as lead songwriter after Bomar's departure. With Yarber in control of the group, the band was rechristened the Tennessee Tearjerkers. At the same time as Yarber was writing songs with the Tearjerkers, he was also contributing in various ways to a number of side projects including, the Knaughty Knights, the Limes, and South Filthy which included collaborations with longtime associates Walter Daniels, and Monsieur Jeffrey Evans. In 2007 Yarber released another solo LP, "The Flip Side Kid." The CD version was released by Sympathy For the Record Industry and Yarber self-released the vinyl under his own label, "Dirt Cheap Date."

The Oblivians reunion
In 2008, The Oblivians and The Gories announced a dual reunion tour, which happened in the summer of 2009, mostly in Europe, but also a couple shows in Memphis and Detroit. Since then, the Oblivians have continued playing sporadic gigs and released a 2015 album via in the Red Records, Desperation.

Discography

As Jack Oblivian
Solo albums
 American Slang 12-inch EP/CD (Sympathy for the Record Industry, 1997, SFTRI 475)
 So Low LP/CD (Sympathy for the Record Industry, 1998, SFTRI 535)
 Bad Mood Rising LP/CD (Sympathy for the Record Industry, 2001, SFTRI 643)
 Don't Throw Your Love Away LP/CD (Sympathy for the Record Industry, 2005, SFTRI 735)
 Jack-O Is The Flip Side Kid LP/CD (Dirt Cheap Records/Sympathy for the Record Industry, 2006, BR-003/SFTRI 778)
 The Disco Outlaw LP/CD (Goner Records, 2009, 45 Gone)
 Rat City LP/CD (Big Legal Mess, 2011)
 Jack O & the Sheiks: Live! LP (Secret Identity/Red Lounge, 2014)
 The Lone Ranger of Love LP (Mony, 2016)

'Solo singles'
 Jack Oblivian & The Cigarillos: "Mad Dog 20/20" (CD Compilation Freakland-iPunkrock, 2003)
 "Chills & Fever" 7-inch (Brown Sound, 2005, BS 001)
 "Original Mixed Up Kid" 7-inch (Bancroft Records, 2006, BR-005)
 "Black Boots" 7-inch (Shattered Records, 2006, SR-013)
 Jack Oblivian & The Cigarillos: "Women's Milk" 7-inch (Ghost Highway Recordings, 2007)
 "Sweet Thang" 7-inch (The Wind Records, 2008, TWR001)
 Jack Oblivian & The Cigarillos: "15 Beers" / "Drinking Women's Milk" 7-inch (Ghost Highway Recordings, 2007)

'Solo cassettes'
 "Is She Crazy" cassette (Mony, 2015)

Solo appears on
 Various Artists – Sunday Nights: The Songs of Junior Kimbrough (2005, Fat Possum Records) – "I'm in Love With You" (Junior Kimbrough)

Other releases

With The End
Singles
 "You Never Called"/"People Talk" 7-inch (Erwin Records, 1985, E-2410/E-2411)

With Johnny Vomit and The Dry Heaves
Singles
 "Johnny Vomit & The Dry Heaves" 7-inch (Goner Records, 1993, 6Gone)
 "Thanks for the Ride!" 7-inch (Goner Records, 2005, 18gone)
 "Running in a Rat Race" 7-inch (Solid Sex Lovie Doll Records, 2006, SSLD 008)

With the Compulsive Gamblers
Singles
 "Joker" 7-inch (Boiler Room, 1992, cat.no.?)
 "Church Goin'" 7-inch (Lemon Peel Records, 1992, LP001 – LP002)
 "Goodtime Gamblers" 7-inch (Boiler Room, 1995, BR 002)

Albums
 Gambling Days are Over CD (Sympathy for the Record Industry, 1995, SFTRI 372)
 Bluff City LP/CD (Sympathy for the Record Industry, 1999, SFTRI 570)
 Crystal Gazing Luck Amazing LP/CD (Sympathy for the Record Industry, 2000, SFTRI 572)
 Live & Deadly: Memphis-Chicago 2xLP/CD (Sympathy for the Record Industry, 2003, SFTRI 698)

With the Oblivians
Singles
 "Call The Shots" 7-inch (Goner Records, 1993, 2Gone)
 "Sunday You Need Love" 7-inch (Crypt, 1994, CR-044)
 "Now for the Hard Of Hearing From … 'Blow Their Cool'" 7-inch (Estrus, 1994, ES 756)
 "Static Party" 7-inch (In The Red, 1994, ITR 018)
 "Go!Pill-Popper!" 7-inch (Drug Racer, 1996, 001)
 "Strong Come On" 7-inch (Crypt, 1996, CR-053)
 "Kick Your Ass" 7-inch (Sympathy for the Record Industry, 1996, SFTRI 412)

Splits
 Split CS with Impala (Goner Records/Power Of Bob, 1993, 0Gone/POB 103)
 Split 7-inch with Two Bo's Maniacs (Hate Records, 1997, hate 7)
 Split 7-inch with the Crime Kaisers (Active Detective, 1998, active detective record #1)

Albums
 Oblivians 10-inch (Sympathy for the Record Industry, 1994, SFTRI 304)
 Soul Food LP/CD (Crypt, 1995, CR-055)
 Live in Atlanta 8.19.94 LP (Negro Records, 1995, negro records 001)
 Six of the Best 10" (Sympathy for the Record Industry, 1996, SFTRI 383)
 The Sympathy Sessions CD (Sympathy for the Record Industry, 1996, SFTRI 406)
 Walter Daniels Plays With Monsieur Jeffrey Evans & The Oblivians at Melissa's Garage 10-inch (Undone, 1995, UDR-0008-10)
 Popular Favorites LP/CD (Crypt, 1996, CR-065)
 ...Play 9 Songs with Mr Quintron LP/CD (Crypt, 1997, CR-082)
 17 Cum Shots LP (Bootleg, 1997, cat.no.?)
 Best of the Worst: 93-97 2xLP/CD (Sympathy for the Record Industry, 1999, SFTRI 584)
 On The Go LP (Goner Records, 2003, 12Gone)
 Barristers 95 [Live] (In the Red, 2009, ITR 182)
 Desperation (In the Red, 2015)

with Tav Falco's Panther Burns
Albums
 FZ 6900 Panther Phobia LP/CD (In The Red, 2000, ITR 069)

with the Knaughty Knights
Singles
 "Connection" 7-inch (Solid Sex Lovie Doll Records, 2002, SSLD 007)
 "I Love It To Death" 7-inch (Perpetrator Records, 2004, PERP 3)
 "Death Has Come Over Me" 7-inch (Goner Records, 2005, 20Gone)
 "Tommy of the River" 7-inch (Shattered Records, 2006, SR-011)
Splits
 "Split" 7-inch with the Wildebeests (Norton Records, 2003, 9641)

with South Filthy
Singles
 "Soul of a Man" 7-inch (Wrecked Em Records, 2003, wrecked 004)
 "Goin' Down The Valley" / "Carry That Load" 7-inch (Beast Records, 2007, BR076)
Albums
 You Can Name It Yo' Mammy If You Wanna... CD (Sympathy for the Record Industry, 2002, SFTRI 701)
 Crackin' Up + You Can Name It Yo' Mammy If You Wanna 2xLP/LP (Rockin' Bones, 2005, RON 062-1/RON062-2)
 Crackin' Up CD (Licorice Tree Records, 2006, YUM 1008)
 Undertakin' Daddy LP (Beast Records, 2009, LP-BR87)

with the Cool Jerks
Singles
 "Whole Wide World" 7-inch (Misprint Records, 2003, msp 0110)
Albums
 Cleaned A Lot Of Plates in Memphis LP/CD (Sympathy for the Record Industry, 2002, SFTRI 689)

with the Limes
Singles
 "Goddamn You Honey" 7-inch (Solid Sex Lovie Doll Records, 2004, SSLD 014)
 "Rock'n'roll Heart" 7-inch (Nasty Product, 2006, NP 10)
Albums
 Tarantula! CD (Death Valley Records, 2005, DV-010)

with the Natural Kicks
Albums
 Natural Kicks CD (Miz Kafrin, 2005, Miz Kafrin 007)

References
 Hurley, Rachael. Rock's Hero for the Rest of Us, "Scenestars.net". Retrieved June 9, 2007.
 Mehr, Bob. 2016 Lone Ranger of Love story

1967 births
Living people
Sympathy for the Record Industry artists
American male singers
Songwriters from Mississippi
People from Corinth, Mississippi
American male songwriters
Tav Falco's Panther Burns members